Palmetto College is the online bachelor's completion program of the University of South Carolina System. The college is made up of the four two-year degree-granting institutions of the USC system: USC Lancaster, USC Salkehatchie, USC Sumter and USC Union. Students who have 60 college credit hours can be admitted to Palmetto College and receive a bachelor's degree. The bachelor's degrees are offered through one of the senior campuses of USC: University of South Carolina Aiken, University of South Carolina Beaufort, University of South Carolina Columbia or University of South Carolina Upstate.

History
Palmetto College was funded by a $5M appropriation by the South Carolina General Assembly in 2012. In January 2013, Susan Elkins was named the first chancellor. Palmetto College officially started enrolling students on April 18, 2013.

References

External links
 http://palmettocollege.sc.edu/

University of South Carolina System
Public universities and colleges in South Carolina